The Journey is the first studio album by Nigerian Afro Pop artist Sean Tizzle. It was released on April 17, 2014 on Difference Entertainment. which was released in 2014. The album features guest appearances from  Olamide, Reminisce, 9ice, Ice Prince, Naeto C, Kcee and Tiwa Savage. The album was supported by four official singles— "Mama Eh", "Komole", "Kilogbe" and "Kilogbe (Remix)" along with the promotional singles "Mama Eh".

Background 
On April 17, 2013 Sean Tizzle began to releasing video blogs titled "TEAR RUBBER - SEAN TIZZLE - SHO LEE" through the Nigezie TV Channel.

Singles 
The album's first promotional single, "Mama Eh" was released on 5 July 2013. On 17 September 2013, the music video was released for "Mama Eh"
The album's track 13, "Komole" was released on October 31, 2013. On 11 December 2013, the music video was released for "Komole"
The album's track 16, "Kilogbe" was released on November 16, 2013. On 2 March 2014, the music video was released for "Kilogbe"
The album's track 4, "Kilogbe (Remix)" featuring Olamide & Reminisce was released on 17 April 2014. On 20 April 2014, the music video was released for "Kilogbe (Remix)"

Critical reception 

Upon its release, The Journey received generally positive reviews from Tooxclusive. At Tooxclusive, which assigns a normalized rating out of 5 to reviews from mainstream critics, the album received an average score of 2.5, based on 3 reviews, which indicates "generally favorable review".
Upon its release, The Journey received generally positive reviews from TheNet. At TheNet, which assigns a normalized rating out of 5 to reviews from mainstream critics, the album received an average score of 3.5, based on 3 reviews, which indicates "generally favorable review".

Track listing

References 

2013 albums
Sean Tizzle albums
Albums produced by D'Tunes
Yoruba-language albums